Ray Jackson may refer to:

Ray Jackson (basketball) (born 1973), American basketball player
Ray Jackson (Aboriginal activist) (1941–2015), Australian Indigenous rights activist
Ray Jackson (musician) (born 1948), British mandolin and harmonica player
Ray Jackson (American football) (Running back, born 1962), American football player
Raymond Jackson (American football) (Defensive back, born 1973), American football player
Ray Jackson (Australian footballer) (1910–1968), Australian rules footballer
Ray Jackson (serial killer) (born 1967), American serial killer

See also
Alvin Ray Jackson (born 1980), American football player
Raymond Jackson (disambiguation)